MUSA is a robot that can fight using Kendo. It was completed in July 2005 by the Manufacturing & Mechatronics Lab of Seoul National University headed by Professor Young-Bong Bang.

References
 Fighting MUSA Robot Unveiled (Kendo, Not Rock'em Sock'em)
 Video of MUSA in operation (Microsoft ASF format)

Humanoid robots
2005 robots
Seoul National University
Robots of South Korea
Rolling robots